The English Baroque Soloists is a chamber orchestra playing on period instruments, formed in 1978 by English conductor Sir John Eliot Gardiner. Its repertoire comprises music from the early Baroque to the Classical period.

History
The English Baroque Soloists developed from the Monteverdi Orchestra, which was formed by John Eliot Gardiner in 1968. The Monteverdi Orchestra played on modern instruments, and accompanied Gardiner's Monteverdi Choir.  In the late 1970s the orchestra transitioned to period instruments and became the English Baroque Soloists. The first concert under the new name was in 1977 at the Innsbruck Festival of Early Music, although the orchestra was not officially formed until 1978.

Relationship with other ensembles directed by Gardiner
The English Baroque Soloists often appear with John Eliot Gardiner's choir, the Monteverdi Choir.

In 1990 Gardiner formed the Orchestre Révolutionnaire et Romantique, another period instrument ensemble.  The Orchestre Révolutionnaire et Romantique specialises in a later repertoire than that of the English Baroque Soloists, but shares some players.

Recordings
The orchestra has recorded under:
Archiv Produktion
Erato_Records
Philips Classics Records
Soli Deo Gloria, a label founded by John Eliot Gardiner in 2004, which originally released recordings made during the Bach Cantata Pilgrimage, but has since broadened its catalogue.

Discography
See Monteverdi Choir's discography section.

See also
John Eliot Gardiner
Monteverdi Choir
Orchestre Révolutionnaire et Romantique

References

External links
English Baroque Soloists - official website
Bach Cantata Pilgrimage

British early music ensembles
Early music orchestras
English orchestras
Musical groups established in 1978
1978 establishments in England
Erato Records artists